The 184th Massachusetts General Court, consisting of the Massachusetts Senate and the Massachusetts House of Representatives, met in 2005 and 2006 during the governorship of Mitt Romney. Robert Travaglini served as president of the Senate and Salvatore DiMasi served as speaker of the House.

Senators

Representatives

See also
 2004 Massachusetts Senate election
 Massachusetts health care reform, 2005-2006 legislation
 2006 Massachusetts gubernatorial election
 2006 Massachusetts ballot measures
 109th United States Congress
 List of Massachusetts General Courts

Images

References

Further reading

External links

 
 
 
 
 

Political history of Massachusetts
Massachusetts legislative sessions
massachusetts
2005 in Massachusetts
massachusetts
2006 in Massachusetts